The Wuhu Yangtze River Bridge is a combined highway and railway bridge over the Yangtze river. The bridge is located in Wuhu, Anhui, China, and was completed in 2000. The bridges carries four lanes of the G5011 Wuhu–Hefei Expressway on the upper deck and the dual-track Huainan Railway on the lower deck.

See also
Yangtze River bridges and tunnels

References

Bridges in Anhui
Bridges over the Yangtze River
Bridges completed in 2000
Cable-stayed bridges in China
Road-rail bridges in China
Double-decker bridges
2000 establishments in China
Extradosed bridges